In architecture, an impost or impost block is a projecting block resting on top of a column or embedded in a wall, serving as the base for the springer or lowest voussoir of an arch.

Ornamental training 
The imposts are left smooth or profiled, and "then express a certain separation between abutment and arch." The Byzantine fighters are high blocks, which are sometimes referred to as pulvino. The Romanesque designed the impost ornamentally or figuratively, similar to the capitals. In the Gothic period, the fighter almost completely disappeared from the calyx bud capital. The architecture of the Renaissance returns to the formation of the imposts of the ancient column orders.

See also
 Capital (architecture)
 Abacus (architecture)
 Pulvino

References

Architectural elements